Gloria Pizzichini (born 24 July 1975) is an Italian former tennis player.

On 18 November 1996, she reached her career-high singles ranking of world No. 45. In the same year, she won her only WTA Tour title. In the 1996 "M" Electronika Cup final, she defeated domestic player Silvija Talaja 6–2, 6–0 to collect the trophy. In her career, Pizzichini defeated players such as Julie Halard, Iva Majoli and Ruxandra Dragomir. She was the first player to be beaten by Elena Dementieva in the main draw of a Grand Slam tournament, at the 1999 Australian Open.

Personal life
Born to Enzo and Maria Pizzichini, Gloria began playing tennis aged seven. She has a sister, Francesca, and a brother, Paolo. Pizzichini cited Stefan Edberg as her role model.

WTA career finals

Singles: 1 title

ITF Circuit finals

Singles: 12 (6–6)

Doubles: 10 (6–4)

References

External links
 
 

1975 births
Sportspeople from the Province of Ancona
Italian female tennis players
Living people